William of Ely was an English churchman and the fifth Lord High Treasurer of England.  He was a relative of Richard FitzNeal and supposed descendant of Nigel, Bishop of Ely, both previous Lord High Treasurers. He was appointed a Canon of St. Paul's just before being made Lord High Treasurer in 1196.  He added the position of Archdeacon of Cleveland in 1201 and Prebendary of Leighton Buzzard in 1207.

A story about William of Ely tells of his attempted escape from England during a time when he had fallen from favour with the King; he was disguised as a commoner but was stopped when he proved unable to respond to a simple question posed to him in English (illustrating the dominance of the French language among nobles and clergymen at the time).

See also
 List of Lord High Treasurers

References

Year of birth unknown
12th-century English Roman Catholic priests
13th-century deaths
13th-century English Roman Catholic priests
Archdeacons of Cleveland
Lord High Treasurers of England